Notre-Dame-du-Nord is a municipality in the Canadian province of Quebec, located in the Témiscamingue Regional County Municipality.  It is located at the northern end of Lake Timiskaming where the Ottawa River enters into this lake.

The municipality is located along Route 101. A local street, rue Ontario, extends westward from Route 101 to the Quebec-Ontario border, where it becomes Ontario Highway 65. In Ontario, the highway passes through the townships of Casey and Harris en route to the city of Temiskaming Shores.

Notre-Dame-du-Nord is best known as the home of an annual truck drag race event called Rodéo du Camion (Truck Rodeo) which is held over the August Civic Holiday of each year, which brings over 650 trucks and 60,000 spectators to the town each year.

Local attractions also include the Lake Timiskaming Fossil Centre, a museum and research institution dedicated to the fossils of the Témiscamingue region, and the Heath Racing motocross track.

History

The area had been known by a variety of names: Tête-du-Lac ("Head-of-the-Lake" in reference to its position at the head of Lake Timiskaming), Pointe à Polson in 1858 (after a First Nations family living there at the time), Murray City in 1862 (in honour of Thomas Murray of Pembroke whose company was logging there), and North Temiscaming at the end of 19th century.

In 1895, the mission located on the north bank of the Rapids des Quinze became a parish under the name of Notre-Dame-du-Nord. In 1919, the place was incorporated as the Township Municipality of Nedelec-Partie-Sud. It was partially destroyed in the Great Fire of 1922. In 1928, it was renamed after the parish.

In 1951, the Municipality of Notre-Dame-des-Quinze, which had developed concurrently on the other side of the rapids, was merged into Notre-Dame-du-Nord.

Demographics
Population trend:

Private dwellings occupied by usual residents: 514 (total dwellings: 534)

Mother tongue:

Historical publications
Notre-Dame-du-Nord 1986–1996, written by Marc Riopel and the "Comité du livre", 1995, 539 pages.

See also
 List of municipalities in Quebec

References

External links
 Notre-Dame-du-Nord

Municipalities in Quebec
Incorporated places in Abitibi-Témiscamingue
1919 establishments in Quebec
Témiscamingue Regional County Municipality